Dragomir Brajković (10 December 1947 – 29 November 2009) was a Montenegrin Serb writer, journalist, editor of Radio Belgrade, poet and member of the Association of Writers of Serbia.

Biography
He was born on 10 December 1947 in the village of Pisana Jela (Bijelo Polje Municipality) in present-day Montenegro. He graduated from the University of Belgrade Faculty of Philology. He began publishing poetry, prose, essays and critical texts in 1966.

He actively advocated the preservation of Serbian–Montenegrin unionism within the Federal Republic of Yugoslavia (1992–2003) and then within the state union of Serbia and Montenegro (2003–2006). In early 2005, he became one of the founders of the Serbian-based Movement for a European State Union of Serbia and Montenegro.

Brajković died from a stroke in his sleep on 29 November 2009. He is interred in the Alley of Distinguished Citizens in the Belgrade New Cemetery.

References

External links

 

1947 births
2009 deaths
People from Bijelo Polje
Serbs of Montenegro
Serbian male poets
Serbian male writers
Serbian male essayists
Serbian novelists
Serbian non-fiction writers
Serbian literary critics
Literary critics of Serbian
Serbian journalists
Serbian philologists
Serbian screenwriters
Male screenwriters
20th-century Serbian novelists
20th-century Serbian poets
20th-century screenwriters
20th-century journalists
20th-century philologists
University of Belgrade Faculty of Philology alumni
Burials at Belgrade New Cemetery